Tourian, alternative writing Turian is a common family name in Armenian.

It may refer to:

Persons
Bedros Tourian, alternatively Petros Duryan, (1851–1872), famous Armenian poet, playwright and actor
Leon Tourian (1879-1933), Armenian Archbishop, primate of the Eastern Diocese of the Armenian Apostolic Church of America, assassinated in New York
Patriarch Yeghishe Tourian of Jerusalem, Armenian Patriarch 1921 to 1929

Fiction
Tourian, a central base on planet Zebes in the fictional Metroid series

Locations
Tourian, Iran, a village in Hormozgan Province, Iran

See also
Turian (disambiguation)

Armenian-language surnames